Diego Gaspar Diellos (born 24 September 1993) is an Argentine footballer who plays as a forward for  Agropecuario.

References

External links

 Diego Diellos at Eurosport

1993 births
Living people
Argentine footballers
Association football forwards
Argentine Primera División players
Ascenso MX players
Expatriate footballers in Mexico
Sportivo Belgrano footballers
Quilmes Atlético Club footballers
Club Atlético Sarmiento footballers
Central Córdoba de Santiago del Estero footballers
Club Almagro players
Cafetaleros de Chiapas footballers
Rangers de Talca footballers
People from San Vicente Partido
Sportspeople from Buenos Aires Province